Portugal–Uruguay relations refers to the current and historical relations between Portugal and Uruguay. Both nations are members of the Organization of Ibero-American States and the United Nations.

History

In 1680, Portuguese colonists established Colônia do Sacramento on the northern bank of Río de la Plata, on the opposite coast from Buenos Aires. Spanish colonial activity increased as Spain sought to limit Portugal's expansion of Brazil's frontiers. The Spanish also moved to capture Colonia del Sacramento. The 1750 Treaty of Madrid secured Spanish control over Banda Oriental (present day Uruguay), and settled the boundaries between Spain and Portugal.

In 1776, the new Viceroyalty of the Río de la Plata was established with its capital in Buenos Aires and it included the territory of Banda Oriental. In 1816, Portugal conquered Banda Oriental from Spain and incorporated the territory into the United Kingdom of Portugal, Brazil and the Algarves and it became the Cisplatina province within Brazil. In 1824, after the Siege of Montevideo, Banda Oriental became an integral part of independent Brazil. In 1825, the newly named Uruguay became an independent nation.

In 1843, Portugal opened a consulate in Montevideo.  In October 1910, Uruguay recognized the Portuguese Republic. In May 1918, Uruguay recognized President Sidónio Pais and his Government.

In October 1998, Uruguayan President, Julio María Sanguinetti, paid a visit to Porto, Portugal to attend the 8th Ibero-American Summit. In 2003, Portuguese President, Jorge Sampaio, paid an official visit to Uruguay. In November 2006, both the President of Portugal, Aníbal Cavaco Silva and Prime Minister, José Sócrates, paid a visit to Uruguay to attend the 16th Ibero-American Summit in Montevideo. In September 2007, Uruguayan President Tabaré Vázquez paid an official visit to Portugal.

In June 2019, the European Union (which includes Portugal) and Mercosur (which includes Uruguay) signed a free trade agreement.

High-level visits
High-level visits from Portugal to Uruguay
 President Jorge Sampaio (2003)
 President Aníbal Cavaco Silva (2006)
 Prime Minister José Sócrates (2006)
 Minister of Foreign Trade Luis Campos Ferreira (2015)
 Deputy Foreign Minister Teresa Ribeiro (2016)

High-level visits from Uruguay to Portugal
 President Julio María Sanguinetti (1998)
 President Tabaré Vázquez (2007)
 Foreign Minister Pedro Vaz (2009)
 Foreign Minister Rodolfo Nin Novoa (2018)

Bilateral agreements
Both nations have signed several bilateral agreements such as an Agreement on the trade of Wine (1877); Trade Agreement (1957); Agreement for the exemption of visas for tourism or business purposes for up to three months (1985); Cultural Agreement (1992); Agreement for the promotion and mutual protection of investments (1997); Agreement of Cooperation in the field of tourism (1998); Agreement for the prevention and repression of illicit trafficking in narcotic drugs and psychotropic substances and their essential substances and chemicals (1998); Agreement for Defense Cooperation (2007); Agreement on Economic Cooperation (2007); Agreement to avoid double taxation and prevent tax evasion in terms of taxes on income and on assets and the respective protocol (2009); Memorandum of Understanding for high-level political consultations (2018) and an Agreement on the exercise of paid professional activities by family members of diplomatic, administrative and technical personnel from diplomatic missions and consular posts (2018).

Resident diplomatic missions
 Portugal has an embassy in Montevideo.
 Uruguay has an embassy in Lisbon.

See also
 Portuguese Uruguayans

References 

 

 
Uruguay
Bilateral relations of Uruguay